Alida is an unincorporated community in Clearwater County, in the U.S. state of Minnesota.

History
A post office was established at Alida in 1898, and remained in operation until being discontinued in 1945. The community was named by John Lind, 14th Governor of Minnesota, perhaps after a place of the same name in Indiana or Kansas.

References

Unincorporated communities in Clearwater County, Minnesota
Unincorporated communities in Minnesota